Lost Horizons is the only studio album released by the symphonic metal band Luca Turilli's Dreamquest. The album featured, until then, an unknown female vocalist (but in the official YouTube channel of Luca Turilli, the unknown female vocalist was revealed as Bridget Fogle, who appeared in The Infinite Wonders of Creation) and Italian musician Luca Turilli, guitarist for Rhapsody of Fire and a number of solo albums, plays keyboards.

The album was released on June 9, 2006 in Germany, Switzerland, and Austria. It was released throughout the rest of Europe on June 12, and in the United States on June 27.

Track listing

Credits
Luca Turilli - keyboards, producer, symphonic and electronic arrangements
Mystique (Bridget Fogle) - lead vocals
Dominique Leurquin - guitars
Sascha Paeth - keyboards, bass, producer, engineer, mixing, mastering
Robert Hunecke-Rizzo - drums
Philipp Colodetti - engineer
Joey DeMaio - executive producer

See also
Luca Turilli
Luca Turilli's Dreamquest
Rhapsody of Fire

External links
Former official Luca Turilli's Dreamquest Web Site
Lost Horizons Blog 
Official Luca Turilli Web Site

Luca Turilli albums
2006 albums